Eldece Clarke-Lewis (born 13 January 1965) is a Bahamian sprints athlete. She was a part of the Bahamian team that won the silver medal in the 1996 Olympics 4 x 100 metres relay. She also ran in the preliminary rounds in the 2000 Olympics 4 x 100 meters relay in Sydney, this would later get her the gold medal as the Bahamian team won in the final.

Achievements

External reference

1965 births
Living people
Bahamian female sprinters
Athletes (track and field) at the 1984 Summer Olympics
Athletes (track and field) at the 1996 Summer Olympics
Athletes (track and field) at the 2000 Summer Olympics
Athletes (track and field) at the 1994 Commonwealth Games
Athletes (track and field) at the 1995 Pan American Games
Athletes (track and field) at the 1999 Pan American Games
Olympic athletes of the Bahamas
Olympic gold medalists for the Bahamas
Olympic silver medalists for the Bahamas
Commonwealth Games competitors for the Bahamas
Pan American Games competitors for the Bahamas
Medalists at the 2000 Summer Olympics
Medalists at the 1996 Summer Olympics
Olympic gold medalists in athletics (track and field)
Olympic silver medalists in athletics (track and field)
World Athletics Championships winners
Olympic female sprinters